Pet Sitters International (PSI) is an educational association for professional pet sitters located in King, North Carolina. The professional pet-sitting association represents nearly 7,000 independent professionals. PSI was established in 1994 by Patti Moran, author of Pet Sitting for Profit.

In 2016, PSI received the Torch Award for Ethics from the Better Business Bureau of Northwest North Carolina.

Pet sitting is defined by the PSI as "the act of caring for a pet in its own home while the owner is away." Dog walking is considered to be a form of pet sitting as well since it involves coming to the pet's home to provide exercise and companionship. Caring for pets in the clients’ homes is what separates pet sitters from boarders and dog daycare.

Other activities include:
 In 1997, Pet Sitters International successfully campaigned to have "pet sitting" added to the Random House Dictionary.
 In 1999, Pet Sitters International created Take Your Dog to Work Day. It is celebrated the Friday following Father's Day.
 In 2010, Pet Sitters International partnered with Garfield to promote professional pet sitting.

Association membership
Pet Sitters International offers United States and Canadian members pet-sitter liability insurance.

The organization provides educational resources to its members, including free member webinars, e-books, monthly e-newsletters and a subscription to their bimonthly magazine. It offers a certification program to become a Certified Professional Pet Sitter. It offers members discounts on business tools including pet-sitter software, background checks and staffing/hiring tools, and maintains an online directory of professional pet sitters that pet owners can search at no cost.

References

External links
Pet Sitters International

Animal organizations